Tupraly (Töpräle) is a rural locality (a village) in Mutabashevsky Selsoviet, Askinsky District, Bashkortostan, Russia. The population was 41 as of 2010. There is 1 street.

Geography 
Tupraly is located 35 km northwest of Askino (the district's administrative centre) by road. Stary Mutabash is the nearest rural locality.

References 

Rural localities in Askinsky District